The Mediation Support Unit was established in 2006 within the Department for Political Affairs as an outcome of the 2005 World Summit which included a call for the expansion of the UN's conflict prevention and resolution capacity.

The MSU serves as a central repository for peacemaking experiences and acts as a clearing house for lessons learned and best practices. The Unit also coordinates training for mediators and provides them with advice on UN standards and operating procedures.

Between 2008 and 2011, the MSU was involved in supporting over 30 peace processes on all continents.

The MSU manages the United Nations Standby Team of Mediation Experts, an on call group of experts who assist mediators in the field that was established in 2008. The MSU also manages the online mediation support tool UN Peacemaker.

References

External links 
 Mediation Support, Department of Political Affairs
 United Nations Guidance for Effective Mediation, published by the MSU as annex to the A/66/811. Report on “Strengthening the role of mediation in the peaceful settlement of disputes, conflict prevention and resolution” of June, 2012, by the United Nations Secretary-General

Mediation
United Nations Secretariat